Polistes bischoffi is a species of paper wasps belonging to the family Vespidae.

Description
These wasps are characterized by a blackish upper side of the antennae, by black cheeks and yellow jaws. The clypeus is yellow with a large black central stripe. Males show a yellow face. The body markings are variable.

Biology
Adults fly from spring to autumn feeding on sugar and nectar and catching caterpillars and flies to feed the larvae. Males die before winter after mating, while mated females overwinter and in next spring build the cells of their nests made of a kind of thin paper. These nests are usually located outside of buildings or hooked to a plant stem or a trunk.

Distribution and habitat
This species is present in the Mediterranean region, in Southern and Central Europe (Austria, Germany, Hungary, Italy, Switzerland), in the Balkan mountains and in the Near East. These paper wasps can be found in woodland edges and meadows.

Gallery

Bibliography
 James M. Carpenter Phylogenetic Relationships among European Polistes and the Evolution of Social Parasitism (Hymenoptera: Vespidae, Polistinae)
Rainer Neumeyer, Hannes Baur, Gaston-Denis Guex & Christophe Praz: A new species of the paper wasp genus Polistes (Hymenoptera, Vespidae, Polistinae) in Europe revealed by morphometrics and molecular analyses. ZooKeys 400: 67–118, doi:10.3897/zookeys.400.6611.
 Rolf Witt: Wespen beobachten, bestimmen. 1. Auflage. Naturbuch-Verlag, 1998,

References

bischoffi
Hymenoptera of Europe
Insects described in 1937